The Palliser Islands or Pallisers are a subgroup of the Tuamotu group in French Polynesia. They are located in the very northwest of the main group of atolls.

Atolls
The group includes:
Apataki
Arutua
Fakarava
Kaukura
Mataiva
Rangiroa
Makatea
Tikehau
Toau

Administration
Administratively, Apataki and Kaukura atolls belong to the commune of Arutua, with a total population of 1510 inhabitants.
Toau, Niau, and Fakarava, belong to the commune of Fakarava. The total population is of 1800 inhabitants.
The commune of Rangiroa consists of 3 atolls: Rangiroa itself, Tikehau and Mataiva, and a separate island (Makatea). The total population is of 3467 inhabitants.

History
The Palliser Islands were named "Palliser's Isles" by Captain James Cook, who was the first European to sight them, on 19 April and 20 April 1774; naming them as such in honour of Admiral Sir Hugh Palliser.

References

Atolls of the Tuamotus
Archipelagoes of the Pacific Ocean